Hernán Toro (born c.1950s) is a Venezuelan cinematographer.

He filmed 100 años de perdón a gangster comedy in 1998.

Filmography
The Child Within (2007) (post-production)
As Luck Would Have It (2003)
3 noches (2001)
Puppet (1999)
100 años de perdón (1998)
Voz del corazón, La (1997)
Twisted (1996)
Señora Bolero (1993)
Roraima (1992)
Zoológico (1992)
Sueño en el abismo, Un (1991)
Escándalo, El (1987)
Operación billete (1987)
Detrás de la noticia (1986)
Agonía (1985)

External links

Venezuelan cinematographers
1950s births
Living people